Moontower is a solo studio album by the Swedish musician Dan Swanö.

Dan Swanö described the album as sounding like “If Rush played death metal in the 1970s”.  The album cover is a close up of Swanö's own eye.

Track listing

Credits
 Dan Swanö - vocals, guitars, bass, keyboards, drums, producer, engineering, mixing

Additional personnel
 Peter in de Betou - mastering
 Anders Storm - photography, layout

References

1999 debut albums
Albums produced by Dan Swanö